The Beaumaris Football Club is an Australian rules football club based in the southern suburbs of Melbourne. The club participates in the Victorian Amateur Football Association (VAFA).

History
Late in 1962 a meeting was held in Beaumaris RSL to form a football club for the boys and men in the local area. The club's founding coincided with the formation of the South East Suburban FL in the summer of 1963. In the 1980s the club were regular but unsuccessful finalists.

In 1995 the club joined the Victorian Amateur Football Association (VAFA), this avoided the need to pay the players. They commenced in E Grade and over a period of twenty years progressed upward to arrive in A Grade in 2017.

Senior Premierships
 South East Suburban Football League (3): 1965, 1970, 1977
 Victorian Amateur Football Association (5): 1995, 1997, 2003, 2010, 2016

VFL/AFL players
 Wayne Judson
 Jason Blake
 Leigh Fisher
 Rod Galt
 Jack Gunston
 Stephen Milne
 David Spriggs
 Cameron Bruce
 Michael Roberts
Sid Catlin
 Jason Mifsud
 Chris Badman
 Ben Strong
 Matt Petering
 Rob Cathcart

References

External links
 Official website

Australian rules football clubs in Melbourne
1962 establishments in Australia
Australian rules football clubs established in 1962
Victorian Amateur Football Association clubs
Sport in the City of Bayside